Hezekiah Cook Seymour (June 24, 1811 – July 24, 1853) was an American civil engineer and politician.

Biography
He was born on June 24, 1811, in Westmoreland, New York, to Bradford Steele Seymour and Mary Cook.

From 1835 to 1849, he worked for the New York and Erie Railroad, first as engineer, later becoming general superintendent.

He was New York State Engineer and Surveyor from 1850 to 1851, elected on the Whig ticket at the New York state election, 1849, but defeated for re-election at the New York state election, 1851 by Democrat William J. McAlpine.

In 1851, he became Chief Engineer of the Ontario,Simcoe and Huron Railway, running from Toronto to Lake Huron in Canada West. The next year, he also participated in the early stages of planning for the construction of the Ohio and Mississippi Railroad, the Louisville and Nashville Railroad, and the Air Line Railroad between New York City and Boston.

He died on July 24, 1853, in Piermont, New York, at age 42. He was buried at Rockland Cemetery in Sparkill, New York.

References

Sources
Description of his grave monument, in NYT on March 23, 1855
His return from Canada, in NYT on December 27, 1851
Google Books The New York Civil List compiled by Franklin Benjamin Hough (pages 37f; Weed, Parsons and Co., 1858)

1811 births
1853 deaths
New York State Engineers and Surveyors
People from Piermont, New York
19th-century American railroad executives
New York (state) Whigs
19th-century American politicians
People from Westmoreland, New York